People's Monarchist Party may refer to:
People's Monarchist Party (Italy)
People's Monarchist Party (Portugal)